Wahidul Alam (born 7 May 1992) is a Bangladeshi cricketer. He made his first-class debut for Chittagong Division in the 2017–18 National Cricket League on 6 October 2017.

References

External links
 

1992 births
Living people
Bangladeshi cricketers
People from Chittagong
Chittagong Division cricketers